Be the Cowboy is the fifth studio album by Japanese-American indie rock musician Mitski, released on August 17, 2018, through Dead Oceans. Produced by longtime collaborator Patrick Hyland, the album widens Mitski's palette with a return to the piano featured on her first two records alongside synthesizers, horns and the guitar that became her signature instrument. Upon its release, Be the Cowboy received widespread acclaim from music critics, who later ranked it among the best albums of 2018. It was preceded by the singles "Geyser", "Nobody", and "Two Slow Dancers". Be the Cowboy was Mitski's first album to chart on the Billboard 200, and also entered the charts in Canada, Ireland, and the United Kingdom.

Writing and recording
In a statement, Mitski said she experimented in narrative and fiction for the album, and said she was inspired by "the image of someone alone on a stage, singing solo with a single spotlight trained on them in an otherwise dark room." She recorded the album with longtime producer Patrick Hyland, and stated that "for most of the tracks, we didn't layer the vocals with doubles or harmonies, to achieve that campy 'person singing alone on stage' atmosphere." She also said the album is about her reconnecting with her feelings: "I had been on the road for a long time, which is so isolating, and had to run my own business at the same time. A lot of this record was me not having any feelings, being completely spent but then trying to rally myself and wake up and get back to Mitski."

Composition
Be The Cowboy has been characterized as a "genre-defying" pop, pop-punk, indie rock, art pop, electrowave, disco, and alt-pop record, with elements of rock, chamber pop, funk,  synth-pop, punk, techno-surf, country rock, and Eurodisco.

Release and promotion
The album was made available for pre-order on May 14, 2018, without prior announcement. "Geyser" was released as the lead single from the album on the same day along with a music video directed by Zia Anger, who also directed the music video for "Your Best American Girl" from Puberty 2 (2016). The song was previously performed in 2014 on WNYU Radio and Hampshire College. On June 26, Mitski released "Nobody" as the second single alongside a music video directed by Christopher Good which was shot over five days in Kansas City. The third and final single to precede the album, "Two Slow Dancers", was released on August 9.

In support of the album, Mitski embarked on a tour including North American and European legs called Be the Cowboy Tour.

Critical reception

At Metacritic, which assigns a normalized rating out of 100 to reviews from mainstream publications, Be the Cowboy received an average score of 87, based on 30 reviews, indicating "universal acclaim". Critics praised Mitski's ability to deftly move from the personal lyrics on her previous album Puberty 2 to more conceptual themes. AllMusic writer Marcy Donelson stated that "rather than being a disappointment, Be the Cowboys point of view provides a brilliant twist, one that channels all the unease, unpredictability, and intuitiveness of Mitski's previous work—even for those who don't take in the lyrics." Laura Snapes similarly commended the album in a review for The Guardian; "Mitski's songwriting trademarks are strong enough to transcend the stylistic revamp – arrangements that are rich without being precious (Pink in the Night), plus her terrifically mordant worldview."

Pitchforks Quinn Moreland called the album Mitski's greatest to date, stating that "she's never sounded so large, even in the record's quietest moments." Rolling Stones Will Hermes wrote, "There may be nothing explicitly political in the songs on Be the Cowboy. But there's plenty implicit, from the DIY American mythology of the title, to the way the songs validate voices that are shaky, hurting, irrational, and damaged, while also being smart, wry, powerful, and deserving of love." The A.V. Club critic Katie Rife said, "Although Be The Cowboy sees Mitski fully transformed from her lo-fi beginnings in terms of production, her post-Pixies guitar-rock tendencies still come through strong, albeit now more lush and kaleidoscopic than buzzing and raucous." Sarah Murphy from Exclaim! applauded the album, saying "The album is all the more impressive because her words and music are meticulously calculated, expertly arranged and still filled with feeling."

Accolades

Track listing

Personnel
Credits adapted from the liner notes of Be the Cowboy.
 Mitski – performance
 Patrick Hyland – performance, saxophone solo 
 Philly Phatness – horns 
 Thor Espanez
 Ian Gray
 Vince Tampio
 Evan Marien – bass 
 Ted Jensen – mastering
 Ryan Smith – lacquer cutting
 Mary Banas – album design
 Bao Ngo – photography
 Carl Knight – lighting
 Annika White – styling
 Marika Aoki – makeup

Charts

Weekly charts

Year-end charts

Certifications

Release history

References

External links
 

2018 albums
Dead Oceans albums
Mitski albums
Art pop albums
Synthwave albums
Pop punk albums by American artists
Pop punk albums by Japanese artists
Disco albums by American artists
Disco albums by Japanese artists